"C Moon" is a song with a reggae beat, written by Paul and Linda McCartney and performed by Wings. It was released as a double A-side with "Hi, Hi, Hi" in 1972. The single reached No. 5 on the UK Singles Chart and since "Hi Hi Hi" was banned by the BBC, "C Moon" received much airplay in the United Kingdom. In the United States, "C Moon" did not appear on any of the major record charts.

Lyrics and structure
The title "C Moon" was inspired by lyrics in the song "Wooly Bully" by Sam the Sham and the Pharaohs. McCartney said, "There's a line in [Wooly Bully] that says, 'Let's not be L7.' Well, L7, it was explained at the time, means a square—put L and 7 together and you get a square... So I thought of the idea of putting a C and a moon together (a half-moon) to get the opposite of a square. So 'C Moon' means cool, in other words."

The recording includes a missed-cue intro that was kept in the released version.

The song is in the key of C and is in 4/4 time. The performers change instruments from their usual places. Guitarist Henry McCullough plays drums, guitarist Denny Laine plays bass, and drummer Denny Seiwell plays xylophone and cornet.

The song was recorded around the same time as "Hi, Hi, Hi", in September 1972.

Releases

The song was included on the Paul McCartney compilation albums All the Best! (1987) and Wingspan: Hits and History (2001). It was also included as a bonus track on the 1993 remastered CD of Red Rose Speedway, as part of The Paul McCartney Collection. It was also included on The 7" Singles Box in 2022.

Personnel
Paul McCartney – lead, harmony and backing vocals, piano, cornet
Linda McCartney – harmony and backing vocals
Denny Laine – bass
Denny Seiwell – xylophone, cornet
Henry McCullough – drums, tambourine

References

Sources
 
 

Paul McCartney songs
Apple Records singles
1972 songs
1972 singles
Paul McCartney and Wings songs
Songs written by Paul McCartney
Songs written by Linda McCartney
Song recordings produced by Paul McCartney
Music published by MPL Music Publishing
Reggae rock songs